Jeremy Stacey (born 27 September 1963) is a British drummer and keyboard player. His early works included the 1990s band The Lemon Trees (with twin brother Paul Stacey on guitars, Guy Chambers and others) and Denzil. He has also played with Sheryl Crow, the Finn Brothers, Nick Harper, Noel Gallagher, The Waterboys, Thomas Anders, Echo & the Bunnymen, Eurythmics, Joe Cocker, Chris Robinson of the Black Crowes, Adam F, Andrea Bocelli, Patricia Kaas, Susanna Hoffs, Mike Scott, Robbie Williams, Aztec Camera, Charlotte Gainsbourg, Nerina Pallot, Claire Martin (drums on Take 1My Heart, 1999), Mark Wingfield, Iain Ballamy, Chris Squire (Chris Squire's Swiss Choir), The Syn (Syndestructible, 2005, again with Paul Stacey), Sia (Colour the Small One), Laurence Cottle, Jason Rebello, Zero 7, Malcolm McLaren, Boris Grebenshchikov, and Steve Hackett.

In 2011 he recorded with Ryan Adams on Ashes & Fire, and again on Ryan Adams in 2014.

He was part of Noel Gallagher's High Flying Birds.

He played on the Squackett album (with Chris Squire & Steve Hackett).

On 7 March 2016 it was announced that he would be taking the place of Bill Rieflin as the centre of three drummers on the 2016 King Crimson European tour, also doubling on keyboards and synthesizers as Rieflin had previously done, this was his first notable appearance on keyboards. He retained this position after Rieflin's return to the band exclusively on keyboards.

He also played on Steven Wilson's album To the Bone.  

He uses Tama drums, Remo drumheads and Istanbul Agop cymbals. He formerly used Zildjian cymbals.

Collaborations 
With Robbie Williams
 I've Been Expecting You (Chyrsalis Records, 1998)
 Sing When You're Winning (Chrysalis Records, 2000)
 Escapology (EMI, 2002)
 Swings Both Ways (Island Records, 2013)
 The Heavy Entertainment Show (Columbia Records, 2016)

With Will Young
 From Now On (RCA Records, 2002)

With Patricia Kaas
 Je te dis vous (Columbia Records, 1993)

With Duncan James
 Future Past (Innocent Records, 2006)

With Nerina Pallot
 Dear Frustrated Superstar (Polydor Records, 2001)
 Fires (Idaho Records, 2006)

With Thomas Anders
 Different (Teldec, 1989)

With Charlotte Gainsbourg
 5:55 (Atlantic Records, 2006)

With Gary Barlow
 Since I Saw You Last (Polydor Records, 2013)

With Eric Clapton
 Clapton (Reprise Records, 2010)

With Susanna Hoffs
 Susanna Hoffs (London Records, 1996)

With Mary Chapin Carpenter
 Sometimes Just the Sky (Lambent Light Records, 2018)

With Joe Cocker
 No Ordinary World (Parlophone Records, 1999)

With Beverley Knight
 Affirmation (Parlophone Records, 2004)

With Neil Diamond
 Melody Road (Capitol Records, 2014)

With James Morrison
 Undiscovered (Polydor Records, 2006)

With Sheryl Crow
 C'mon, C'mon (A&M Records, 2002)
 Detours (A&M Records, 2008)

With Ryan Adams
 Ashes & Fire (Capitol Records, 2011)
 Ryan Adams (PAX AM, 2014)

With David Cross and Peter Banks
 Crossover (2020)

With Scott McKeon
 New Morning (2021)

References

External links
 

1963 births
Living people
British male drummers
English rock drummers
Musicians from London
The Lemon Trees members
Noel Gallagher's High Flying Birds members
Twin musicians